The 1967 Isle of Man Tourist Trophy was a motorcycle road racing event held on the 37-mile Snaefell Mountain course on the Isle of Man. Five races, in different engine capacity classes of 50, 125, 250, 350 and the 500 cc Senior TT, made up the second round of the FIM World Grand Prix motorcycling championship season (now known as MotoGP). Mike Hailwood, on the four-cylinder Honda RC181, duelled with Giacomo Agostini's  MV Agusta 500 Three.

Hailwood responded with a second lap at  but Agostini still led by 8.6 seconds. At the halfway pit stop of the six-lap race, Hailwood had cut Agostini's lead to a couple of seconds, but he then lost time adjusting his twist grip back into place. Agostini's lead was back up to 11.6 seconds. It was a battle as Hailwood, riding near to his limit, pursued the Italian rider. By the fifth lap, Hailwood had made up the difference and the riders appeared close to a dead heat, with the closest of finishes appearing likely.

Then disaster struck Agostini on the mountain section when his chain broke at the Windy Corner. He was able to coast back to the pits, but he was disqualified for missing Governor's Dip before coasting down to the pits. In the heat of the moment Agostini threw his helmet to the ground. Hailwood went on to win at a record . His lap record stood for eight years, and was only beaten in 1975 by Mick Grant on an improved circuit riding a larger-engined Kawasaki KR750 cc. Hailwood's original Honda RC181 500 cc four-cylinder bike is owned by the Hailwood Trust and occasionally demonstrated at public events by his son David.

1967 Isle of Man Production 750 cc TT final standings
10 June 1967 – 3 laps Mountain Course.

1967 Isle of Man Production 500 cc TT final standings
10 June 1967 – 3 laps Mountain Course.

1967 Isle of Man Production 250 cc TT final standings
10 June 1967 – 3 laps Mountain Course.

1967 Isle of Man Sidecar TT final standings
12 June 1967 – 3 laps Mountain Course.

1967 Isle of Man Lightweight TT 250cc final standings
12 June 1967 – 6 laps Mountain Course.

1967 Isle of Man Lightweight TT 125cc final standings
14 June 1967 – 3 laps Mountain Course.

1967 Isle of Man Junior TT 350cc final standings
14 June 1967 – 6 laps Mountain Course.

1967 Isle of Man TT 50cc final standings
16 June 1967 – 3 laps Mountain Course.

1967 Isle of Man Senior TT 500cc final standings
16 June 1967 – 6 laps TT Mountain Course.

Sources

External links
 Detailed race results
 Mountain Course map

Isle of Man Tt
Tourist Trophy
Isle of Man TT
Isle of Man TT